The following is a list of Australian Army artillery units in World War I.

Divisional Artillery

1st Division Artillery

1st Division Artillery
Formed August 1914 and assigned to 1st Division.

Subunits:

 1st Division Ammunition Column August 1914 – past November 1918
 1st Field Artillery Brigade August 1914 – past November 1918
 1st Field Artillery Battery
 2nd Field Artillery Battery
 3rd Field Artillery Battery
 101st Field Artillery (Howitzer) Battery
 1st Brigade Ammunition Column
 2nd Field Artillery Brigade August 1914 – past November 1918
 4th Field Artillery Battery
 5th Field Artillery Battery
 6th Field Artillery Battery
 102nd Field Artillery (Howitzer) Battery
 2nd Brigade Ammunition Column
 3rd Field Artillery Brigade August 1914 – 20 January 1917
 7th Field Artillery Battery
 8th Field Artillery Battery
 9th Field Artillery Battery
 103rd Field Artillery (Howitzer) Battery
 3rd Brigade Ammunition Column
 21st Field Artillery (Howitzer) Brigade February 1916 – 23 January 1917
 22nd Field Artillery Battery
 23rd Field Artillery Battery
 24th Field Artillery Battery
 116th Field Artillery (Howitzer) Battery
 21st Brigade Ammunition Column
 V1A Heavy Trench Mortar Battery 17 April 1916 – 21 February 1918
 X1A Medium Trench Mortar Battery 17 April 1916 – 21 February 1918
 Y1A Medium Trench Mortar Battery 17 April 1916 – 21 February 1918
 Z1A Medium Trench Mortar Battery 17 April 1916 – 21 February 1918
 1st Medium Trench Mortar Battery 21 February 1918 – past November 1918
 2nd Medium Trench Mortar Battery 21 February 1918 – past November 1918
 1st Heavy Artillery Battery

2nd Division Artillery
2nd Division Artillery 
Formed September 1915 and assigned to 2nd Division

Subunits:

 2nd Division Ammunition Column September 1915 – past November 1918
 4th Field Artillery Brigade 23 September 1915 – past November 1918
 10th Field Artillery Battery
 11th Field Artillery Battery
 12th Field Artillery Battery
 104th Field Artillery (Howitzer) Battery
 4th Brigade Ammunition Column
 5th Field Artillery Brigade 6 September 1915 – past November 1918
 13th Field Artillery Battery
 14th Field Artillery Battery
 15th Field Artillery Battery
 105th Field Artillery (Howitzer) Battery
 5th Brigade Ammunition Column
 6th Field Artillery Brigade 19 October 1915 – 20 January 1917
 16th Field Artillery Battery
 17th Field Artillery Battery
 18th Field Artillery Battery
 106th Field Artillery (Howitzer) Battery
 6th Brigade Ammunition Column
 22nd Field Artillery (Howitzer) Brigade February 1916 – 27 January 1917 
 19th Field Artillery Battery
 20th Field Artillery Battery
 21st Field Artillery Battery
 117th Field Artillery (Howitzer) Battery
 22nd Brigade Ammunition Column
 V2A Heavy Trench Mortar Batter 17 April 1916 – 21 February 1918
 X2A Medium Trench Mortar Battery 17 April 1916 – 21 February 1918
 Y2A Medium Trench Mortar Battery 17 April 1916 – 21 February 1918
 Z2A Medium Trench Mortar Battery 17 April 1916 – 21 February 1918
 3rd Medium Trench Mortar Battery 21 February 1918 – past November 1918
 4th Medium Trench Mortar Battery 21 February 1918 – past November 1918

3rd Division Artillery
Formed February 1916 for 3rd Division

Subunits:

 3rd Division Ammunition Column February 1916 – past November 1918
 7th Field Artillery Brigade February 1916 – past November 1918
 25th Field Artillery Battery
 26th Field Artillery Battery
 27th Field Artillery Battery
 107th Field Artillery (Howitzer) Battery
 7th Brigade Ammunition Column
 8th Field Artillery Brigade February 1916 – past November 1918
 29th Field Artillery Battery
 30th Field Artillery Battery
 31st Field Artillery Battery
 108th Field Artillery (Howitzer) Battery
 8th Brigade Ammunition Column
 9th Field Artillery Brigade February 1916 – 6 January 1917 
 33rd Field Artillery Battery
 34th Field Artillery Battery
 35th Field Artillery Battery
 118th Field Artillery (Howitzer) Battery
 9th Brigade Ammunition Column
 23rd Field Artillery (Howitzer) Brigade February 1916 – 6 January 1917
 28th Field Artillery Battery
 32nd Field Artillery Battery
 36th Field Artillery Battery
 109th Field Artillery (Howitzer) Battery
 23rd Brigade Ammunition Column
 V3A Heavy Trench Mortar Battery August 1916 – 21 February 1918
 X3A Medium Trench Mortar Battery August 1916 – 21 February 1918
 Y3A Medium Trench Mortar Battery August 1916 – 21 February 1918
 Z3A Medium Trench Mortar Battery August 1916 – 21 February 1918
 5th Medium Trench Mortar Battery 21 February 1918 – past November 1918
 6th Medium Trench Mortar Battery 21 February 1918 – past November 1918

4th Division Artillery
Formed Egypt February 1916 for 4th Division

Subunits:

 4th Division Ammunition Column February 1916 – past November 1918
 10th Field Artillery Brigade February 1916 – past November 1918
 37th Field Artillery Battery
 38th Field Artillery Battery
 39th Field Artillery Battery
 110th Field Artillery (Howitzer) Battery
 10th Brigade Ammunition Column
 11th Field Artillery Brigade February 1916 – past November 1918
 41st Field Artillery Battery
 42nd Field Artillery Battery
 43rd Field Artillery Battery
 111th Field Artillery (Howitzer) Battery
 11th Brigade Ammunition Column
 12th Field Artillery Brigade February 1916 – 20 January 1917
 45th Field Artillery Battery
 46th Field Artillery Battery
 47th Field Artillery Battery
 101st Field Artillery (Howitzer) Battery
 119th Field Artillery (Howitzer) Battery
 12th Brigade Ammunition Column
 24th Field Artillery (Howitzer) Brigade February 1916 – 23 January 1917
 40th Field Artillery Battery
 44th Field Artillery Battery
 48th Field Artillery Battery
 24th Brigade Ammunition Column
 V4A Heavy Trench Mortar Battery June 1916 – 21 February 1918
 X4A Medium Trench Mortar Battery June 1916 – 21 February 1918
 Y4A Medium Trench Mortar Battery June 1916 – 21 February 1918
 Z4A Medium Trench Mortar Battery June 1916 – 21 February 1918
 7th Medium Trench Mortar Battery 21 February 1918 – past November 1918
 8th Medium Trench Mortar Battery 21 February 1918 – past November 1918

5th Division Artillery
Formed Egypt February 1916 for 5th Division

Subunits:

 5th Division Ammunition Column February 1916 – past November 1918
 13th Field Artillery Brigade February 1916 – past November 1918
 49th Field Artillery Battery
 50th Field Artillery Battery
 51st Field Artillery Battery
 113th Field Artillery (Howitzer) Battery
 13th Brigade Ammunition Column
 14th Field Artillery Brigade February 1916 – past November 1918
 53rd Field Artillery Battery
 54th Field Artillery Battery
 55th Field Artillery Battery
 114th Field Artillery (Howitzer) Battery
 14th Brigade Ammunition Column
 15th Field Artillery Brigade February 1916 – 22 January 1917
 57th Field Artillery Battery
 58th Field Artillery Battery
 59th Field Artillery Battery
 15th Brigade Ammunition Column
 25th Field Artillery (Howitzer) Brigade February 1916 – 23 January 1917
 120th Field Artillery (Howitzer) Battery
 52nd Field Artillery Battery
 56th Field Artillery Battery
 60th Field Artillery Battery
 115th Field Artillery (Howitzer) Battery
 25th Brigade Ammunition Column
 V5A Heavy Trench Mortar Battery June 1916 – 21 February 1918
 X5A Medium Trench Mortar Battery June 1916 – 21 February 1918
 Y5A Medium Trench Mortar Battery June 1916 – 21 February 1918
 Z5A Medium Trench Mortar Battery June 1916 – 21 February 1918
 9th Medium Trench Mortar Battery 21 February 1918 – past November 1918
 10th Medium Trench Mortar Battery 21 February 1918 – past November 1918

Siege artillery

 1st Siege Artillery Brigade
 1st Siege Artillery Battery
 2nd Siege Artillery Battery
 338th Siege Artillery Battery
 1st Siege Battery Ammunition Column
 2nd Siege Battery Ammunition Column

Captured units
 'A' Captured Gun Battery

Heavy trench mortar batteries
 V Heavy Trench Mortar Battery

Reserve units
 Reserve Artillery Brigade
 1st Field Artillery Training Battery
 2nd Field Artillery Training Battery
 3rd Field Artillery Training Battery
 4th Field Artillery Training Battery
 5th Field Artillery Training Battery

Training depot
 Artillery Training Depot

See also
Royal Regiment of Australian Artillery
Military history of Australia during World War I

References

Notes

Bibliography

External links
 List of AIF Artillery units
 Digger History: AIF Artillery

Military units and formations of Australia in World War I

Army artillery units in World War I